Italy competed at the 1978 European Athletics Indoor Championships in Milan, Italy, from 11 to 12 March 1978.

Medalists

Top eight
13 Italian athletes reached the top eight in this edition of the championships.
Men

Women

See also
 Italy national athletics team

References

External links
 EAA official site 

1978
1978 European Athletics Indoor Championships
1978 in Italian sport